Ville Väinölä (born 9 January 1996) is a Finnish ice hockey defenceman. He is currently playing with RoKi in the Finnish Mestis.

Väinölä played seven games in the Liiga with Pelicans during the 2014–15 Liiga season.

References

External links

1996 births
Living people
Finnish ice hockey defencemen
KeuPa HT players
Lahti Pelicans players
Peliitat Heinola players
People from Nastola
SaPKo players
Sportspeople from Päijät-Häme